Domingo "Darquez" Salazar was a Filipino mass murderer, who killed 16 people in the barangay of San Nicolas in Roxas, Palawan, on October 11, 1956.

Background
Salazar, a Moro native of Zamboanga, lived with his common-law wife, Máxima Pacho, in Barangay San Nicolas. Due to his suspicions that his wife had an affair with her sister's husband, Fortunato Nares, and that the child she was pregnant with was not his own, he planned to vindicate his honour by exacting his vengeance from them.

Killings
On the morning of October 11, 1956, the 42-year-old Salazar asked his wife to accompany him while gathering nipa for the repair of their house. Máxima's pregnant sister, Romana, arrived and invited her to accompany her to her house to get palay. Máxima refused to join her husband, which infuriated him. Salazar armed himself with a spear and a bolo knife and first killed Romana, before fatally attacking his pregnant wife and his nephew, Fortunato Nares Jr. Salazar afterwards made his way through the village and entered four houses, murdering everyone he found therein.

At the school compound, he stabbed Manuel Adion in the back with his spear; though severely wounded, Adion was able to escape. Salazar then chased two other men, Pablo Páz and Severino Adion, and threw his spear at them, hitting neither, before trying to enter the schoolhouse. The teacher present had already locked and barricaded the schoolhouse's door and windows, and Salazar was unable to force his way in. He lastly went to the local chapel and tolled the bell, calling for everybody to come. He asked to be killed, but no one dared to obey.

Eventually, two armed guards and a barrio officer arrived at the scene and persuaded Salazar to surrender. They did so by promising that they would shoot and kill him at the wharf, but only after he had signed a piece of paper that was to protect them from repercussions from higher authorities. When Salazar lay down his arms and was about to affix his thumbmark on the paper, he was subdued and arrested.

Aftermath
On October 24, 1956, Salazar's physical and mental state was examined by the chief of the Puerto Princesa Hospital, who declared him normal and sane. After he had pleaded guilty, Salazar was sentenced to death once for each of the 16 murders, as well as multi-year prison sentences for frustrated and attempted murder. He was also fined, required to pay the heirs of his victims ₱3,000.

During his appeal hearing on June 30, 1959, the sentence was retained, but the court found his confession and admission of guilt mitigating, so his conviction for the murders of his wife Máxima and Romana Pacho, as well as of Fortunato Nares, was changed to reclusión perpetua. The indemnity payable to his victims' relatives was raised to ₱6,000.

Victims

References

1910s births
Filipino mass murderers
Filipino former Christians
Filipino Muslims
Filipino murderers of children
Mass murder in 1956
People from Palawan
Familicides
Possibly living people